Karel Hirman (born 1 June 1970) is a Slovak engineer, manager and politician. Since September 2022 he has served as the Economy minister of Slovakia.

Early life 
Hirman studied oil and gas extraction and transport at the Gubkin Russian State University of Oil and Gas and mining at the Technical University of Košice.

Professional career 
After graduation, Hirman worked as a journalist for the Czech Press Agency as well the Slovak Economic weekly Trend, covering the Commonwealth of Independent States and energy topics.

Since 2005, Herman managed several energy companies in Slovakia, including Košice public heating provider Tepláreň Košice, state-owned oil transporatation company TRANSPETROL as well as nickel distributor ENERGY-METAL. 

Herman was in charge of implementation of a large-scale energy consumption optimization project funded by the European Investment Bank in the Prešov region. Between 2007 and 2014 he headed the energy department of the Slovak Innovation and Energy Agency. He is also a regular contributor to the outputs of the think tank Slovak Foreign Policy Association.

Political career 
Hirman served as an advisor to multiple politician, including the Foreign Affairs minister Miroslav Lajčák and the Prime Minister Iveta Radičová. He also advised the Christian Democratic Movement and the Progressive Slovakia parties on their energy policies. He also served in the team of Ivan Mikloš advising the Ukrainian prime minister Volodymyr Groysman.

Following the abdication of Richard Sulík, Hirman was included in the government as a Minister of the Economy on 13 September 2022.

References 

1970 births
Living people
Economy ministers of Slovakia
Slovak engineers